Saridoscelinae is a subfamily of moths of the family Yponomeutidae.

Genera
Saridoscelis Meyrick, 1894
?Eucalantica Busck, 1904

External links
Eucalantica: a lost child of Saridoscelinae, a subfamily new to the New World

Yponomeutidae
Moth subfamilies